Michael or Mike Jones may refer to:

Entertainment
Michael Jones (Canadian musician) (1942–2022), new-age pianist
Michael Jones (film director) (1944–2018), Canadian screenwriter
Michael Jones (Welsh-French musician) (born 1952)
Michael Spencer Jones (born 1961), British art photographer and music video director
Mike Jones (jazz musician) (born 1962), performs with Penn and Teller
Mike Jones (screenwriter) (born 1971), American screenwriter and journalist
Mike Jones (rapper) (born 1981), American rapper
Michael Jones (actor) (born 1987), American voice actor
Michael Jones (1959–2016), birth name of American musician Kashif
Michael Jones (born 1980), birth name of American rapper Wax
Michael Jones (born 2007) absolute baseball stud.

Sports

American football
Mike Jones (wide receiver, born 1960), American football player
Mike Jones (tight end) (born 1966), American football tight end
Mike Jones (defensive lineman) (born 1969), American football player
Mike Jones (linebacker) (born 1969), American football player most famous for the tackle that saved the St. Louis Rams from a loss in Super Bowl XXXIV
Mike Jones (offensive lineman) (born 1985), American football player
Mike Jones (wide receiver, born 1992), Canadian football wide receiver
Mike Jones (defensive back) (born 1995), Canadian football defensive back
Mac Jones (Michael McCorkle Jones, born 1998), American football quarterback

Association football
Mike Jones (footballer) (born 1987), English footballer
Michael Jones (English footballer) (born 1987), English footballer
Michael Jones (New Zealand footballer)
Mike Jones (soccer) (born 1988), American soccer player
Mike Jones (referee) (born 1968), English football referee

Baseball
Mike Jones (1890s pitcher) (1865–1894), Canadian baseball pitcher
Mike Jones (1980s pitcher) (born 1959), American baseball pitcher

Basketball
Mike Jones (basketball, born 1956), American basketball player, formerly for the Illawarra Hawks in Australia
Mike Jones (basketball, born 1965), American basketball head coach at UNC Greensboro
Mike Jones (basketball, born 1967), American basketball player, formerly for Auburn University
Mike Jones (basketball, born 1984), American basketball player, formerly for the University of Maryland

Other sports
Mike Jones (wrestler) (born 1962), professional wrestler primarily known as "Virgil" in the WWF
Mick Jones (hammer thrower) (born 1963), English hammer thrower
Michael Jones (rugby union) (born 1965), New Zealand rugby union player and coach
Mike Jones (motocross rider) (born 1966), American freestyle motocross rider also known as "Mad Mike Jones"
Michael Jones (boxer) (born 1974), English boxer of the 1990s and 2000s
Mike Jones (canoeist) (died 1978), English expedition canoeist
Mike Jones (boxer) (born 1983), American boxer of the 2000s and 2010s
Mike Jones (motorcyclist) (born 1994), Australian motorcycle racer
Michael Jones (swimmer) (born 1994), British Paralympic swimmer
Michael Jones (cricketer) (born 1998), Scottish cricketer
Mike Jones (athletic director) (born 1954), athletic director and men's basketball head coach

Other people
Michael Jones (soldier) (died 1649), colonel during the Irish Confederate War
Michael D. Jones (1822–1898), founder of the Welsh settlement in Patagonia
Michael Rotohiko Jones (1895–1978), New Zealand interpreter and broadcaster
Michael Jones (historian) (born 1940), British historian
Mike Jones (painter) (1941–2022), Welsh artist
Michael Jones, Lord Jones (1948–2016), Scottish judge
Mike Jones (personal trainer) (born 1957), alleged to have had an affair with evangelical preacher Ted Arthur Haggard
Mike Jones (Pennsylvania politician), American politician from Pennsylvania
Mike Jones (Alabama politician), member of the Alabama House of Representatives
Michael Jones (activist) (born 1964), American psychology writer and practitioner
Michael Jones (scientist), computer vision researcher
Michael Jones (entrepreneur) (born 1975), American entrepreneur and investor
Michael Gresford Jones (1901–1982), Church of England bishop
Michael Jones (priest) (died 1719), Anglican priest in Ireland 
Mike Jones, pseudonym of Sywald Skeid (born 1971)
Mike Jones, security guard who shot Clay Duke during the 2010 Panama City school board shootings

Fictional characters
Mike Jones, a character in the film Babel
Mike Jones, the protagonist of the 1990 Nintendo game StarTropics

See also
Mick Jones (disambiguation)
Who Is Mike Jones?, a 2005 album by the rapper Mike Jones